Coalition for El Bierzo (CB, Coalición por El Bierzo) is a Bercian regionalist coalition founded in 2015, by the Party of El Bierzo and the Party of the Land 7, along with various independents.

The coalition won 39 local seats and two mayors (Balboa and Torre del Bierzo) in the 2015 local elections. The coalition also won 62 representatives, including 21 village mayors, in the "pedanías" (local entities smaller than the municipalities).

External links
 Official website

References

2015 establishments in Castile and León
Political parties established in 2015
Political parties in the Province of León
Regionalist parties in Spain